Zachary Herivaux (born 1 February 1996) is a professional footballer who plays as a midfielder for USL Championship club Tampa Bay Rowdies. Born in Japan, he represents the Haiti national team.

Career

New England Revolution
Herivaux attended Beaver Country Day School. He joined the New England Revolution youth team in 2011 before signing as a Homegrown Player on 2 May 2015.

He made his professional debut as an 87th-minute substitute in a 2–0 loss against Charlotte Independence in a U.S. Open Cup fixture on 17 June 2015.

On 15 March 2019, Herivaux was loaned to USL Championship side Birmingham Legion FC. The loan is open-ended and allows the Revolution to recall Herivaux at any time.

Herivaux was released by New England at the end of their 2019 season.

San Antonio FC
On 24 January 2020, Herivaux signed with USL Championship side San Antonio FC.

Birmingham Legion
On 31 March 2021, Herivaux signed with Birmingham Legion.

Tampa Bay Rowdies
Herivaux was announced as a new signing for USL Championship side Tampa Bay Rowdies ahead of their 2023 season on 8 December 2022.

International career
Before playing for Haiti, Herivaux was also eligible to represent Japan and the United States. His father, Pedro, is a Haitian former footballer. He represented Haiti U20's at the 2015 CONCACAF U-20 Championship.

Herivaux's debut for the senior Haiti national team came in a 3–3 2017 Kirin Challenge Cup tie with Japan on 10 October 2017.

On 29 May 2018, Herivaux was called up to the senior national team in an international friendly 0–4 loss against Argentina. "There was so much light, so much blue and white and the fans shouting 'Messi!' It stays loud the whole time," Herivaux said in a post-game interview. He also added: "It's such an opportunity. I soaked it all in."

In May 2019, he was named to Haiti's 40-man provisional squad for the 2019 CONCACAF Gold Cup.

Personal life
Herivaux is a citizen of the United States, Japan, and Haiti. His cousins are tennis players Naomi Osaka and Mari Osaka.

References

External links
 
 
 
 

1996 births
Living people
2015 CONCACAF U-20 Championship players
American sportspeople of Haitian descent
American soccer players
American sportspeople of Japanese descent
Association football midfielders
Association football people from Osaka Prefecture
Citizens of Haiti through descent
Haiti international footballers
Haiti youth international footballers
Haitian footballers
Haitian people of Japanese descent
Japanese footballers
Japanese people of Haitian descent
Major League Soccer players
New England Revolution players
Sportspeople from Brookline, Massachusetts
People from Suita
San Antonio FC players
Soccer players from Massachusetts
USL Championship players
Birmingham Legion FC players
2019 CONCACAF Gold Cup players
2021 CONCACAF Gold Cup players
Homegrown Players (MLS)
Beaver Country Day School alumni
Tampa Bay Rowdies players